Donika Kelly (born early 1980s) is an American poet and academic, who is Assistant Professor of English at the University of Iowa, specializing in poetry writing and gender studies in contemporary American literature. She is the author of the chapbook Aviarium, published with fivehundred places in 2017, and the full-length collections Bestiary (Graywolf Press, 2016) and The Renunciations (Graywolf Press, May 2021).

Bestiary is the winner of the 2015 Cave Canem Poetry Prize, the 2017 Hurston/Wright Award for poetry, and the 2018 Kate Tufts Discovery Award, and was longlisted for the National Book Award in 2016 and a finalist for a Lambda Literary Award and a Publishing Triangle Award in 2017.

Kelly earned her MFA in Writing from the Michener Center for Writers and a Ph.D. in English from Vanderbilt University. She is a Cave Canem Graduate Fellow, the recipient of a Lannan Residency fellowship, and a fellowship to the Fine Arts Work Center in Provincetown, Massachusetts. Her poems have appeared in The Paris Review, Foglifter, and The New Yorker, among other journals and magazines, and she is a contributor to the 2019 anthology New Daughters of Africa, edited by Margaret Busby. Kelly lives in Iowa with her wife Melissa Febos.

Biography

Early years
Kelly was born in Los Angeles, California, in the early 1980s and moved with her family to Arkansas in the late 1990s.

Education 
In 2005, Kelly received a Bachelor of Arts in English from Southern Arkansas University. She received a Master of Fine Arts from the University of Texas in 2008. Her thesis was called The White Meat. In 2009, she obtained a Master of Arts from Vanderbilt University. Her thesis, Framing the Subject in Natasha Trethewey’s Bellocq’s Ophelia, analyzed Natasha Trethewey's book on Ernest J. Bellocq's photography, specifically those of unnamed mixed-race prostitutes. Kelly finished her Ph.D in English Literature from Vanderbilt University in August 2013. Her dissertation was titled Reading against Genre: Contemporary Westerns and the Problem of White Manhood. In it, Kelly explains how the way in which society perceives the role of white men is largely influenced by the way they are portrayed in media, with a particular focus on contemporary Western films.

Awards and honors 
 National Book Award, Longlist, 2016
Cave Canem Poetry Prize, Winner, 2015
Bayard Rustin Advocacy Award, Office of LGBTQI Life, Vanderbilt, 2015
Thomas Daniel Young Award for Excellence in Teaching, Vanderbilt, 2013
Cave Canem Graduate Fellow, 2009, 2011, 2013
Provost's Graduate Fellowship, Vanderbilt University, 2008–2013
University Fellowship, Vanderbilt University, 2008–2013
James A. Michener Fellow in Writing, 2005–2008
Bucknell Seminar for Younger Poets, June Fellow, 2004
Anisfield-Wolf Book Award, 2022

Bibliography

Poetry 
Collections
 
 
Chapbooks
 Aviarium (500 Places, 2017)
List of poems

"Bedtime Story For The Bruised Heart", "Cartography As An Act of Remembering", "The Three Birds Of The Milky Way" and "Labyrinth," Sinister Wisdom, 2017
"The Oracle Remembers the Future Cannot Be Avoided", "Gun Control (Mama)", and "Primer: D’Aulaire’s Book of Greek Myths", Tin House, 2017
"In the Chapel of St. Mary’s" and "Self-Portrait in Labyrinth", Washington Square, 2017
"Partial Hospitalization", Buzzfeed Reader, 2016
"Love Poem: Chimera", Gulf Coast, 2016
"Construction", "Revelation: Black Bear", "Revelation: White Bear", and "Pony", Rockhurst Review, 2016
"Bower Bird", "Swallow", and "How to be alone", Virginia Quarterly Review, 2016
"Love Poem: Centaur" and "Love Poem Mermaid", Pleiades, 2016
"Fourth Grade Autobiography", Nashville Review, 2016
"Handsome Is", "Little Box", and "Love Letter", Gris-Gris, 2016
"Acheron" and "Hymn", Cincinnati Review, 2015
"Ocelot", Eleven Eleven Journal, 2015
"Statistics", Rove, 2015
"A Man Goes West and Falls Off His Horse in the Desert" and "Self-Portrait as a Door", Tupelo Quarterly, 2013
"Arkansas Love Poem", The Best of Kore Press, 2013
"Love Poem: Griffon", West Branch, 2013
"Last rites", RHINO, 2013
"Tender" and "What Gay Porn Has Done for Me", Bloom, 2012
"Love Poem: Minotaur" and "Sonnet in which only one bird appears", Vinyl, 2012
"The Yard", "Love Song", "Whale", "Arkansas Love Song", and "Where she is opened. Where she is closed", The Feminist Wire, 2011
"Archaeology" and "Perhaps you tire of birds", Crazyhorse, 2011
"Whale", Hayden’s Ferry Review, 2011
"Sanctuary", "Where We End Up" and "Brood", in Margaret Busby (ed.), New Daughters of Africa, 2019.

Theses 
 
 
———————
Notes

Sources 
 Kelly, Donika (2013). Reading against Genre: Contemporary Westerns and the Problem of White Manhood
 Kelly, Donika (2009), Framing the Subject in Natasha Trethewey’s Bellocq’s Ophelia
http://donikakelly.com/

References

External links
 Official website
 "Donika Kelly", Poetry Foundation.
 "Pushcart Darlings: The Foglifter Interview with Donika Kelly", Foglifter Press, December 27, 2017.

21st-century American poets
21st-century American women writers
American women academics
American women poets
Living people
Place of birth missing (living people)
Southern Arkansas University alumni
St. Bonaventure University faculty
The New Yorker people
University of Texas alumni
Vanderbilt University alumni
Year of birth missing (living people)
American LGBT poets